Omamori Himari is a Japanese manga series written and illustrated by Milan Matra. The story follows Yuto Amakawa, an orphaned boy who, on the day of his sixteenth birthday, meets Himari, a sword-wielding girl who turns out to be a cat spirit. He soon discovers that his family is one of the twelve Demon Slayer families that had slain demons for hundreds of years, and that Himari has sworn an ancient oath to protect him from the demons that are out to kill him until his powers fully awaken. Throughout the series, Yuto encounters other girls who later take a romantic liking to him, most of them ayakashi: Shizuku, a mizuchi in the form of a small child, Lizlet, a tsukumogami in the form of a busty tea-serving maid, and Kuesu, the heiress of the Jinguji Family of Demon Slayers and Yuto's fiancée.

Omamori Himari began monthly serialization in the July 2006 issue of Monthly Dragon Age (released on June 9, 2006), and ran until the October 2013 issue (released September 9, 2013), spanning a total of seventy-five chapters. Twelve bound volumes were released by Fujimi Shobo from February 1, 2007 to November 9, 2013. The first five volumes were published under Kadokawa Shoten's "Dragon Jr." imprint, while the remaining volumes were published under Fujimi Shobo's "Dragon Comics Age" imprint. An official guidebook to the series (sold as Volume 0) was also released by Kadokawa Shoten on October 24, 2009. The manga was also serialized in Fujimi Shobo's paid online magazine, Age Premium, starting from the inaugural September 2011 issue (released on August 3, 2011) to the November 2013 issue.

A four-panel spinoff called , illustrated by Nikubanare, began serialization in the November 2009 issue of Monthly Dragon Age and ended in the November 2010 issue. A compilation called  was released on April 9, 2010. A bonus two-part side story, called , also illustrated by Nikubanare, was released by Kadokawa Shoten on September 9, 2011. The stories were serialized in the May 2011 and June 2011 issues of Monthly Dragon Age.

Omamori Himari is licensed in North America by Yen Press, and released all thirteen volumes (twelve plus Volume 0) from October 26, 2010 to July 22, 2014. The manga is also licensed in Taiwan by one of Kadokawa Shoten's subsidiary companies, Kadokawa Media, and in Germany by Panini Comics under the title of Talisman Himari. A 12-episode anime adaptation created by animation studio Zexcs ran between January and March 2010 on TV Saitama, Chiba TV, and other networks.

Individual chapters of the series are called , and each chapter uses either the kanji, katakana, or hiragana for  within its title. 


Volumes list

Spin-offs

See also
 List of Omamori Himari episodes
 List of Omamori Himari characters

References

External links
Official Omamori Himari manga website

Omamori Himari
Chapters